Waterloo is a 1970 epic historical war film about the Battle of Waterloo. A co-production between Italy and the Soviet Union, it is directed by Sergei Bondarchuk and produced by Dino De Laurentiis. It stars Rod Steiger as Napoleon Bonaparte and Christopher Plummer as the Duke of Wellington with a cameo by Orson Welles as Louis XVIII of France. Other stars include Jack Hawkins as General Sir Thomas Picton, Virginia McKenna as the Duchess of Richmond and Dan O'Herlihy as Marshal Ney.

Steiger and Plummer often narrate sections in voice-over, presenting thoughts of Napoleon and Wellington.  The film takes a largely neutral stance and portrays many individual leaders and soldiers on each side, rather than simply focusing on Wellington and Napoleon. It creates a mostly-accurate chronology of the events of the battle, the extreme heroism on each side, and the tragic loss of life suffered by all the armies which took part.

The film is most famous for its lavish battle scenes, shot on-location in Uzhhorod, Ukraine. The impact of the 15,000 authentically dressed extras, recreating the battle sections with true numbers and without special effects, is unsurpassed, and remains the highest number of costumed extras in any film. The film received mixed reviews from critics, but won several awards, including BAFTAs for Best Costume Design and Best Art Direction, and the 1971 David di Donatello for Best Film.

Plot 
In the aftermath of the disastrous Battle of Leipzig, French Emperor Napoleon Bonaparte is forced to abdicate at the demands of his marshals in 1814. Exiled to Elba with 1,000 men, Napoleon escapes and once more rallies the French to his side. King Louis XVIII flees, and the European powers declare war once again. In Brussels during the Duchess of Richmond's ball, the Duke of Wellington is warned of Napoleon's march into Belgium, tactically driving a wedge between the British and Prussian armies. Wellington, in consulting with his staff, elects to halt Napoleon at Waterloo.

At Quatre-Bras, Marshal Ney fights the British to a draw, whereas Napoleon defeats the Prussians at Ligny. Ney rides to Napoleon to deliver his report, but in doing so has allowed Wellington to withdraw his still intact forces. Napoleon commands Grouchy to lead 30,000 men against the Prussians to prevent their rejoining the British, whilst Napoleon will command his remaining troops against Wellington.

On June 18, 1815, the battle of Waterloo commences with initial cannon fire from the French. Napoleon launches teasing attacks against Wellington's flanks at Hougoumont and La Haye Sainte, though Wellington refuses to divert his main force. General Picton is sent to plug a gap when a Dutch brigade is routed, and though successful he is killed in doing so. Ponsonby also leads a cavalry charge against the French cannon, but becomes isolated from the main allied force and is cut down by French lancers.

Troops spotted emerging from the east are worryingly assumed to be Grouchy by Wellington, and Blücher to Napoleon. Suffering from stomach pain, Napoleon momentarily withdraws and leaves Ney in command. Simultaneously, the order is given to allied troops to retire 100 paces, which Ney incorrectly interprets as a withdrawal.

Ney leads a cavalry charge against the British, but is repelled with casualties by infantry squares. Despite this, the battle still wages much in Napoleon's favor; La Haye Sainte falls to the French, and Napoleon ultimately decides to send the Imperial Guard to deliver the decisive blow.

During their advance, Maitland's Guards Division who were lying in tall grass deliver a devastating point blank volley against the Imperial Guard, repulsing them with heavy casualties. At the same time, Blücher arrives in the field. For the first time in its history the Imperial Guard breaks, and the battle is won by the Allied forces.

That evening after the battle, Wellington is seen observing the thousands of casualties on the field. Napoleon, having survived the battle, is urged to flee at the pleas of his marshals.

Cast

The French and allies 

 Rod Steiger as Emperor Napoleon I
 Dan O'Herlihy as Marshal Michel Ney
 Philippe Forquet as Brigadier-General Charles de la Bédoyère
 Gianni Garko as Major-General Antoine Drouot
 Ivo Garrani as Marshal Nicolas Jean-de-Dieu Soult
 Charles Millot as Marshal Emmanuel de Grouchy, Marquis de Grouchy
Yevgeny Samoylov as Brigadier-General Pierre Cambronne
Vladimir Druzhnikov as Général de Division Étienne Maurice Gérard
 Andrea Checchi as Old Guardsman
 Orazio Orlando as Constant
 Gennadi Yudin as Grenadier Chactas
 Armando Bottin as Sous-Lieutenant Legros
 Rodolfo Lodi as Joseph Fouché
 Jean Louis as Marshal Nicolas Oudinot
 Boris Molchanov as Général de Division Henri Gatien Bertrand
 Lev Polyakov as Général de Division François Étienne de Kellermann
 Giorgio Sciolette as Marshal Louis-Alexandre Berthier
 Sergio Testori as Lieutenant-General Marcellin Marbot
 Yan Yanakiyev as Dr. Dominique Jean Larrey
 Rostislav Yankovsky as Charles Joseph de Flahaut

The British and allies 

Christopher Plummer as Field Marshal Arthur Wellesley, 1st Duke of Wellington
Orson Welles as King Louis XVIII of France
Jack Hawkins as Lieutenant-General Sir Thomas Picton
Virginia McKenna as Charlotte Lennox, Duchess of Richmond
Rupert Davies as Colonel Alexander Gordon, 4th Duke of Gordon
Ian Ogilvy as Colonel Sir William Howe De Lancey
Michael Wilding as Major-General The Honourable Sir William Ponsonby
Sergo Zakariadze as Field Marshal Gebhard von Blücher, Fürst von Wahlstatt
Terence Alexander as Lieutenant-General Henry Paget, 2nd Earl of Uxbridge
Donal Donnelly as Corporal O'Connor
Oleg Vidov as Tomlinson
Charles Borromel as Mulholland
Peter Davies as Lieutenant-Colonel James Hay, Lord Hay
Veronica De Laurentiis as Magdalene De Lancey
Willoughby Gray as Major William Ramsay
Roger Green as Duncan
Richard Heffer as Captain Cavalié Mercer
John Savident as Major-General Karl Freiherr von Müffling
Jeffry Wickham as Colonel Sir John Colborne
Susan Wood as Lady Sarah Lennox
Andrea Esterhazy as Charles Lennox, 4th Duke of Richmond
Karl Lyepinsk as Generalfeldmarschall August Neidhardt von Gneisenau

Production
De Laurentiis announced the film in October 1965, saying it would be made the following year. John Huston was to direct.

Columbia Pictures published a 28-page, full-colour pictorial guide when it released Waterloo in 1970. According to the guidebook, Italian producer Dino De Laurentiis had difficulty finding financial backers for the massive undertaking until he began talks with the Soviets in the late 1960s and reached agreement with Mosfilm. Final costs were over £12 million (GBP) (equivalent to about U.S. $38.3 million in 1970), making Waterloo one of the most expensive movies ever made, for its time.

Had the movie been filmed in the West, costs might have been as much as three times this. Mosfilm contributed more than £4 million of the costs, and nearly 17,000 soldiers of the Soviet Army, including a full brigade of Soviet cavalry, and a host of engineers and labourers to prepare the battlefield in the rolling farmland outside Uzhhorod, Ukrainian SSR.

To recreate the battlefield "authentically", the Soviets bulldozed away two hills, laid five miles of roads, transplanted 5,000 trees, sowed fields of rye, barley and wildflowers and reconstructed four historic buildings. To create the mud, more than six miles of underground irrigation piping was specially laid. Most of the battle scenes were filmed using five Panavision cameras simultaneously – from ground level, from 100-foot towers, from a helicopter, and from an overhead railway built right across the location.

However, the authentic nature of  the topography is questionable and has more to do with dramatic panoramic filmshots rather than topographical accuracy: in reality the Waterloo site is laid out as a series of low hillocks with few opportunities for long views. In particular La Haye Sainte is almost invisible from the north and west, sitting in a small south-facing hollow.

Actual filming was accomplished over 28 weeks, which included 16 days of delay (principally due to bad weather). Many of the battle scenes were filmed in the summer of 1969 in often sweltering heat. In addition to the battlefield in Ukraine, filming also took place on location in the Royal Palace of Caserta, Italy, while interior scenes were filmed on the large De Laurentiis Studios lot in Rome. The battle sequences of the film included about 15,000 Soviet foot soldiers and 2,000 cavalrymen as extras and 50 circus stunt riders were used to perform the dangerous horse falls. It has been joked that Sergei Bondarchuk was in command of the seventh-largest army in the world.

Months before the cameras started filming, the 17,000 soldiers began training to learn 1815 drill and battle formations, as well as the use of sabres, bayonets and handling cannons. A selected 2,000 additional men were also taught to load and fire muskets. This army lived in a large encampment next to the battlefield. Each day after breakfast, they marched to a large wardrobe building, donned their French, British or Prussian uniforms and fifteen minutes later were in position.

The soldiers were commanded by officers who took orders from director Sergei Bondarchuk via walkie-talkie. To assist in the direction of this huge, multi-national undertaking, the Soviet-Ukrainian director had four interpreters permanently at his side: one each for English, Italian, French and Serbo-Croatian.

Reception
Waterloo has an approval rating of 27% based on 11 reviews on the review aggregator website Rotten Tomatoes, with an average rating of 5.7/10.

It was the fifth most popular "reserve ticket" movie at the British box office in 1971. However, it failed to recoup its cost. Post release saw the film gain popularity and receive numerous positive reviews for its battle depiction. Several historical characters listed in the credits do not actually appear in the film, they are said to have been in scenes cut before release.

The film won two BAFTA awards in 1971 (Best art direction and best costume design) and was nominated for a third (best cinematography). The film was also novelised by Frederick E. Smith, with the content based on the screenplay.

The meager box office results of Waterloo led to the cancellation of Stanley Kubrick's planned film biography of Napoleon.

New Zealand film director Peter Jackson, famous for the adaptations of The Lord of the Rings and The Hobbit, said that the film inspired his future projects.

Awards & nominations

Historical inaccuracies

While the film portrays the events of the Hundred Days quite faithfully, including some allusions to and scenes from the Battle of Ligny and of Quatre Bras, there were a few departures from historical fact, presumably made for artistic purposes, and some characters act as ciphers for others.

In the opening scene, where the marshals are attempting to persuade Napoleon to abdicate, Marshal Soult is present: in reality, in 1814 Soult was commanding the defence of Toulouse against Wellington's Army.

The Duchess of Richmond tells Wellington that she does not want her daughter "to wear black before she wears white". The tradition of the bride wearing white did not arise until the 1840s, following Queen Victoria's wedding.

At the Duchess of Richmond's ball (which itself was held in a former carriage house rather than the magnificent ballroom depicted), there is an entirely fictional romantic sub-plot with Lord Hay and one of the Duchess' daughters. However her daughter Sarah did recall Lord Hay being present at the ball.

Perhaps the biggest inaccuracy in the film is the battleground itself: having had torrential rain the previous night, which delayed the French attack until midday, the battlefield was extremely muddy. In consequence, the British cavalry, in reality, would not have been able to acquire the speed shown in the film before encountering the French columns. However, here, as elsewhere, the film replicates a famous painting of the battle, in this case Elizabeth Thompson's 1881 work Scotland Forever!, which depicts the cavalry galloping towards the enemy.

Another inaccuracy is that the Household cavalry do not seem to appear in the movie at all. Further, Ponsonby, commander of the Union Brigade, is believed to have initially been taken prisoner by French cavalry, before being killed during a failed rescue attempt. In the film, he tells the Earl of Uxbridge that Ponsonby's father had been killed in battle by lancers, not least because he had been riding an inferior horse: in fact his father had been a politician who died of natural causes back in England, and he is simply foretelling his own fate in the battle.

The British cavalry charge was aimed at d'Erlon's corps, but in the film the cavalry do not appear to engage French infantry at all, but instead charge straight into French artillery, scattering French gunners before themselves being driven back by French lancers, in scenes that bear some cinematic resemblance to the Charge of the Light Brigade. Nor are any 92nd Highlanders seen hanging onto their stirrups as they charge, as was recalled by Corporal Dickson of "F" Troop of the Scots Greys.

Overall, the film almost completely ignores the Dutch-Belgian and German elements of the army under Wellington's command, giving the impression that the allied army was essentially British. In reality, the British contingent was less than half of Wellington's troops..

Unlike the Prussians in the film, arriving at the right flank of the French force, General Bülow's 4th corps attacked at the rear-right of the French lines at the village of Plancenoit. Napoleon sent first his reserve corps (under General Lobau) and then the Second Foot Grenadiers, the second-most-senior corps of his Imperial Guard, to engage and delay these Prussians while maintaining his front line; these clashes in and around the village of Plancenoit were crucial to the battle but are not depicted in the film. (Around 7:30 p.m., another Prussian corps under Marshal Blücher arrived on the battlefield to link with the British army on the grounds of the inn La Belle Alliance, sealing the fate of the French force—as shown in the film.)

The Duke of Gordon is depicted as leading his Gordon Highlanders into battle, and is described by the Duchess of Richmond as "uncle": in fact, he is a composite character, representing the contributions of several members of the House of Gordon. The Duke at the time, the founder and colonel of the regiment, was the Duchess of Richmond's father, and he saw no active service overseas during the Napoleonic Wars. His son and the Duchess's brother, the Marquis of Huntly (later the 5th Duke) was a distinguished general, but held no command in the campaign, although anecdotal evidence suggests that he arrived during the aftermath of the battle.

The senior representative of the family at the battle was in fact the Duchess's own twenty-three-year-old son, the Earl of March, who would eventually become the 5th Duke's heir in 1836, and who served as a major and an aide-de-camp (ADC) to the Duke of Wellington. Another branch of the family was represented by another ADC, Colonel Sir Alexander Gordon, aged twenty-eight or twenty-nine, the brother of the Earl of Aberdeen. In reality, both were young men similar in age and duty to Lord Hay. The field commander of the Gordon regiment during the campaign, Lieutenant Colonel, John Cameron of Fassiefern, had been killed at the battle of Quatre Bras on 16 June. The acting commander of the regiment during the battle appears to have been Major Donald MacDonald of Dalchosnie.

Lord Hay is seen being killed during the French cavalry attack, whilst inside a British square, with Wellington witnessing his death. Hay was actually killed at the Battle of Quatre Bras, two days earlier.

The story of the refusal of the guard to surrender has been the subject of much controversy over the centuries. Commander of the last Imperial Guard square, General Pierre Cambronne, is portrayed as responding "merde" although he denied it later. Nor did he say "La garde meurt et ne se rend pas!" ("The Guard dies and does not surrender!") which is believed to have been uttered by General Claude-Étienne Michel, commander of the Middle Guard.

Cambronne did not die in the battle, and having been knocked unconscious, was captured by Colonel Hugh Halkett, commander of the 3rd Hanoverian Brigade. He later married the Scottish nurse who cared for him after the battle, and died in 1842.

References

Notes

External links

 
 
 

1970 films
1970s war drama films
1970s historical drama films
1970 drama films
Bondarchuk family
British historical drama films
British war drama films
Columbia Pictures films
Cultural depictions of Arthur Wellesley, 1st Duke of Wellington
Cultural depictions of Gebhard Leberecht von Blücher
Cultural depictions of Louis XVII
Cultural depictions of Napoleon
Depictions of Napoleon on film
English-language Italian films
English-language Soviet films
Films about battles and military operations
Films directed by Sergei Bondarchuk
Films scored by Nino Rota
Films set in 1812
Films set in 1815
Films set in France
Films set in Belgium
Films set in Waterloo, Belgium
Films shot in Italy
Films shot in Ukraine
Italian drama films
Mosfilm films
Napoleonic Wars films
Paramount Pictures films
Russian war drama films
Soviet historical drama films
Soviet war drama films
War films based on actual events
War epic films
Works about the Battle of Waterloo
1970s English-language films
1970s British films
1970s Italian films